Ugo Didier (born 11 September 2001) is a French Paralympic swimmer. He represented France at the 2020 Summer Paralympics.

Career
Didier made his international debut for France at the 2017 World Para Swimming Championships at the age of 14.

Didier was born with club feet and weakness in both legs. He represented France in the men's 400 metre freestyle S9 at the 2020 Summer Paralympics and won a silver medal. He also competed in the men's 200 metre individual medley SM9 event and won a bronze medal.

References

External links
 
 

2001 births
Living people
Paralympic swimmers of France
Medalists at the World Para Swimming Championships
Medalists at the World Para Swimming European Championships
Swimmers at the 2020 Summer Paralympics
Medalists at the 2020 Summer Paralympics
Paralympic silver medalists for France
Paralympic bronze medalists for France
Paralympic medalists in swimming
French male freestyle swimmers
French male backstroke swimmers
French male medley swimmers
S9-classified Paralympic swimmers